Shake, Rattle & Roll is a 1984 Filipino horror anthology film directed by Emmanuel H. Borlaza, Ishmael Bernal, and Peque Gallaga. It is the first installment in the Shake, Rattle & Roll film series. This was the only film in the series to be produced and distributed by Athena Productions, with the rest of the installments produced and distributed by Regal Films.

The film consists of three short stories: "Baso", which is about teenagers who unwittingly unleash spirits by using a spirit board; "Pridyider", about a malevolent refrigerator; and "Manananggal", about a a vampire-like creature from Philippine mythology. Shake, Rattle & Roll was an entry of the 10th Metro Manila Film Festival, with Herbert Bautista winning Best Actor for his role in the "Manananggal" segment.

The second installment, Shake, Rattle & Roll II, was released in 1990.

Plot

"Baso"
Paolo, Girlie and Johnny perform a spirit of the glass in an abandoned house. When they contact the spirits; namely Isabel, Ibarra and Juanito, the spirits break free from the glass and possess the teens.

In the Spanish era, Isabel is the daughter of Soledad and Antonio. She loves Juanito, a soldier who is battling against the Spaniards, but has to love her suitor Ibarra, a handsome and wealthy man and Juanito's companion. The next day after Juanito leaves for battle, one of his companions allegedly report to Isabel that Juanito died from the battle. Devastated by his loss, Isabel continues her engagement to Ibarra. After Isabel and Ibarra celebrate their marriage, they are attacked by an enraged Juanito who is revealed to be alive after being cheated on by Isabel but Ibarra kills him as Juanito vowed vengeance against Ibarra and Isabel for their betrayal. Moments after his death, Ibarra commits suicide from the guilt of Juanito's death and Isabel dies from her sickness due to excessive depression. Their spirits haunt the abandoned house and begin to reenact their past.

Back at the present, Paolo and Johnny, who are still possessed by Ibarra and Juanito, begin to fight each other but the caretaker, Mang Castor saves them and Girlie by warding off the spirits from their bodies. The teens seem to go back to normal but Juanito repossesses Johnny and stabs Paolo with an axe. In retaliation, the latter grabs the gun and shoots Johnny as Juanito's spirit is expelled from Johnny. The boys die from their wounds, in front of the traumatized Girlie.

"Pridyider"
The Delfin family moved to a new house after the husband migrated to Saudi Arabia for work. The family consists of Lorna, her daughter Virgie, their housekeeper Nelia and the husband's lecherous nephew Dodong. Their home includes an old refrigerator from the kitchen.

The next day, Lorna becomes suspicious of their refrigerator after she saw visions of body parts around her when she gathered food. Later, when Nelia was taking a snack, the refrigerator attacks her. The fridge drags Nelia and slams her repeatedly before she collapses to the floor dead. In Detective Caloy Torres' investigations on Nelia's death, the detective believes that Dodong was responsible for the incident but Lorna denied Torres' accusations as Dodong was claimed to be innocent. He tried to clarify about the incident and his suspicions on Dodong to Lorna and advises her to protect her daughter. The next day, Virgie's boyfriend Max was found dead when Lorna discovered his severed arm. Lorna calls back the detective to take Dodong into custody but he was killed as well after Torres found his severed head in the fridge.

Torres becomes suspicious of how the incident is related to previous crimes that happened in 1975. In his research, he found out from an old newspaper that a serial rapist murdered his victims and hide their chopped body parts in the refrigerator. Concerned about the danger that plagued on Lorna and her daughter, Torres races to the house to save them. Meanwhile, at the house, the refrigerator begins to consume Virgie. Torres and Lorna arrive to save her but the fridge was able to consume Virgie further. Lorna managed pull the plug off the fridge from the socket, neutralizing the refrigerator's power and saving her daughter from danger. Afterwards, Torres shows the family the newspapers about the crime that happened in the house.

"Manananggal"
Douglas, a young Visayan teenager, stays with his grandmother to take responsibility with his young brothers Gio and Zia when their parents are working in Davao.

The next day after Douglas tried to serenade a mysterious young woman at her hut, he discovered his friend Kadyo was murdered in the forest. An unknown creature lurks throughout the surroundings as he and Gio, who was looking for their pet dog, to hide. The brothers return to the hut and inform the incident to their grandmother. She reveals that an airborne vampire-like creature: the manananggal was responsible behind the murders in the town at nighttime during Holy Week and that Anita, the lady whom Douglas had serenaded earlier, was the creature.

On Good Friday, Douglas was pursued by Anita through the forest but left after he remained at a small shrine. At night after being given some faithful encouragement from a penitent, Douglas witnessed Anita transformed into a manananggal and flies off. While she left, Douglas dismantled her lower body half with salt and holy water to prevent the creature from rejoining with her upper body half before sunrise. The manananggal reappears and began to pursue Douglas and Gio. The brothers manage to reach the hut and Douglas fight the creature off with a palaspas while Gio and his grandmother barricade their home. As morning comes, the manananggal escapes but realized that Douglas had destroyed her lower body and in a fit of rage, continued to attack the brothers and their grandmother. She breaks into the hut and pins Douglas but with the aid of Gio and his grandmother, he manage to shove the creature into exposed sunlight as she disintegrates in the process.

At Black Saturday while the family burn its remains, they are visited by two young local boys who delivered medicine for the brothers and also brought back their dog before departing, after they question Douglas about the incident.

Cast

Baso
Rey "PJ" Abellana as Paolo/Ibarra
Joel Torre as Johnny/Juanito
Arlene Muhlach as Girlie/Isabel

Pridyider
Charito Solis as Lorna Delfin
William Martinez as Dodong
Janice de Belen as Virgie Delfin
Emily Loren as Nelia
Mon Alvir as Max
Lito Gruet as Detective Caloy Torres

Manananggal
Herbert Bautista as Douglas
Irma Alegre as Anita
Peewee Quijano as Gio
Mary Walter as Lola

Accolades

Reception

Legacy
In 2018, Jio de Leon of Spot.ph ranked the refrigerator from the film's "Pridyider" segment eighth on his list of the "Top 10 Scariest Pinoy Horror Movie Monsters".

Sequels

Shake, Rattle & Roll is followed by fourteen sequels. Each sequel brings returning actors from each film to reprise different characters.

Remake
In 2012, the segment titled "Pridyider" was remade as a film titled Pridyider.

See also
List of ghost films

Notes

References

External links

1984 films
1980s comedy horror films
1984 comedy films
1984 horror films
Films directed by Ishmael Bernal
Films directed by Peque Gallaga
Philippine horror anthology films
Regal Entertainment films
1